Nathaniel "Mack" Burton (born c. 1939 - May 16, 2017) was a Canadian football player who played for the BC Lions. He won the Grey Cup with them in 1964. He played college football at the San Jose State University. Burton was inducted into the San Jose State University Sports Hall of Fame. Burton was selected in the fifth round of the 1962 NFL Draft by the Chicago Bears, but did not play in the league.

References

1930s births
BC Lions players
Players of Canadian football from San Francisco
San Jose State Spartans football players
2017 deaths
Players of American football from San Francisco